Scott Thomas Fortune (born January 23, 1966) is an American former volleyball player. He was an All-American at Stanford University and a three-time Olympian for the United States national team. He helped the U.S. win the gold medal at the 1988 Summer Olympics.

Career

High school
Fortune played for the volleyball team at Laguna Beach High School. He helped the team win the 1983 CIF championship. As a senior, he was named the South Coast League's most valuable player. Fortune was also a point guard on the school's basketball team.

College
Fortune played for Stanford from 1985 to 1989. He was named to the All-America first team in 1987 and 1989. He helped Stanford advance to the NCAA Final Four in 1989.

International
Fortune joined the U.S. national team in 1986. He was a member of the gold medal winning team at the 1988 Summer Olympics. In 1991, he was named the USOC Male Volleyball Athlete of the Year. He won the best passer and best digger awards at that year's World League. At the 1992 Summer Olympics, Fortune was named best digger and helped the U.S. win the bronze medal. He also played in the 1996 Summer Olympics.

Professional
Fortune played on the 4-Man Pro-Beach Tour from 1992 to 1995. In 1993, he was named the offensive player of the year. In 1994, he played for the league champions, Team Sony Autosound. Fortune also played for clubs in Greece and Italy.

After volleyball
Fortune now works at Magee Thompson Investment Partners in San Diego. He has worked there as their Research Analyst and Portfolio Manager for 16 years. He works alongside David Magee, Portfolio Manager and Chief Investment Officer. Kelly Thompson, Marketing Officer and Client Service Manager. Eric Romaine, Office Trader.

Personal
Fortune was born in Newport Beach, California, on January 23, 1966. He is 6 feet, 6 inches tall and weighs 195 pounds. His brother Todd was a University of California volleyball player.

References

1966 births
Living people
American men's volleyball players
Volleyball players at the 1988 Summer Olympics
Volleyball players at the 1992 Summer Olympics
Volleyball players at the 1996 Summer Olympics
Olympic gold medalists for the United States in volleyball
Olympic bronze medalists for the United States in volleyball
Medalists at the 1988 Summer Olympics
Stanford Cardinal men's volleyball players
Olympiacos S.C. players
Sportspeople from Newport Beach, California
American men's beach volleyball players
Medalists at the 1992 Summer Olympics